Escuintla is an industrial city in Guatemala, its land extension is 4384 km², and it is nationally known for its sugar agribusiness. Its capital is a minicipality with the same name. Citizens celebrate from December 6 to 9 with a small fair in honor to The Immaculate Conception.

In 2002 the city had a population of 86,678. It is located on the border of the central highlands and the Pacific coastal plain.

Etymology 
Many of the names of the municipalities of Guatemala consist of one of two things: the name of a catholic saint to worship the day the city was founded or a description with Náhuatl roots.  These influences are due to the troops in command of Pedro de Alvarado who invaded the region in 1520.  These troops were composed of Spanish soldiers and indigenous Tlaxcaltecs.

The name Escuintla, comes from the indigenous language nahuatl «Itzcuintlán», which is a word composed of two words:

·       «Itzcuintli»: means “dog”

·       «tlan»: means “abundance”

Therefore, Escuintla means “abundance or place of dogs”.

History 
Escuintla used to be an important stop for trains going to Puerto San José until 2007.

Economy
The city is among the more industrialized areas of the country. One of the most important agricultural products of the region is sugar cane. Other products are tobacco, seafood, and cattle.
Escuintla is bathed by the waters of the Pacific, and produces about 43 percent of gross domestic product of Guatemala, is statistically the department, province or region in Mesoamerica with lower unemployment and extreme poverty, this contrasts with the economic and social reality of Guatemala.

Geography
The city of Escuintla consists of 2 villages and 12 surrounding communities.  The area includes 7 mountains, 55 rivers, 9 streams, and 21 brooks.

Geographic location
To the north of the municipality of Escuintla is Yepocapa (municipality of Chimaltenango) and Alotenango (municipality of Sacatepequez).  To the East is Palin, San Vicente Pacaya, and Guanagazapa (municipality of Escuintla).  To the south is Masagua (municipality of Escuintla).  To the west is La Democracia, Siquinalá, and Santa Lucía Cotzumalguapa (municipality of Escuintla).

Transportation
Today, the CA-2 and CA-9 highways cross here.

Municipal Government 
The government of the cities of Guatemala are made of a municipal council.  This is in accordance with article 254 in the Political Constitution of the Republic of Guatemala.  The municipal code, which is similar to the ordinary law and contains disposition that applies to all cities of Guatemala, establishes in article 9 that the municipal council covers the deliberations and decisions of municipal issues.

The municipal council integrates with accordance of what the Constitution declares in article 254 which says that the council consists of a mayor, trustees, and councilors that have been elected and may be reelected by the public for a period of four years.  With respect to the municipal code, article 9 of the constitution explains that this system is done in all municipalities in accordance to the stated law.

The mayors of Escuintla:
 2016-2020: Abrahám Rivera Estévez

Sports
Juventud Escuintleca football club play their home games at the Estadio Ricardo Muñoz Gálvez. Most recently they have again been playing in the second tier of Guatemalan football.

Climate

Escuintla has a tropical monsoon climate (Köppen: Am).

Geographic location

See also

Escuintla Department

References

External links
 Escuintla on prensalibre.com

Municipalities of the Escuintla Department